Krombach is a small river of Bavaria, Germany. It flows into the Kahl in Blankenbach.

See also
List of rivers of Bavaria

Rivers of Bavaria
Rivers of the Spessart
Aschaffenburg (district)
Rivers of Germany